Umar Usman Dukku was elected Senator for the Gombe North constituency of Gombe State, Nigeria at the start of the Nigerian Fourth Republic, running on the People's Democratic Party (PDP) platform. He took office on 29 May 1999.
After taking his seat in the Senate in June 1999, he was appointed to committees on Selection, Ethics (vice chairman), Foreign Affairs, Police Affairs, and State & Local Government.
Later he was appointed Chairman of the Senate Committee on National Population.
After leaving office, Dukku became Chairman of the Kaduna Polytechnic Governing Council.

References

Living people
People from Gombe State
Peoples Democratic Party members of the Senate (Nigeria)
Kaduna Polytechnic people
20th-century Nigerian politicians
21st-century Nigerian politicians
Year of birth missing (living people)